The following lists events that happened in 1975 in Libya.

Incumbents
 Prime Minister: Abdessalam Jalloud

Events
 Muammar Gaddafi announces a first time Five-Year Economic and Social Transformation Plan (1976–80)
 Publication of the Green Book, detailing the Third International Theory

1975–76 Libyan Premier League

Births
Date unknown
 Sema Sgaier (born in Tripoli), scientist, global health expert, and documentary photographer

 
Years of the 20th century in Libya
Libya
Libya
1970s in Libya